The women's javelin throw (F46) at the 2018 Commonwealth Games, as part of the athletics programme, took place in the Carrara Stadium on 9 April 2018. The event was open to para-sport athletes competing under the F46 classification.

Records
Prior to this competition, the existing world record was as follows:

Schedule
The schedule was as follows:

All times are Australian Eastern Standard Time (UTC+10)

Results
With five entrants, the event was held as a straight final.

Final

References

Women's javelin throw (F46)
2018 in women's athletics